The Tebul language, also known as Tebul Ure, is a Dogon language spoken in Mali by the Tebul U (Tebul people). It was first reported under this name online by Roger Blench, who erroneously reported that it appears to be the same as a language called Oru Yille in the literature. This mistaken name instead means 'two words' in the Tebul language.

The language is divergent within Dogon and may constitute its own branch of that family, though it shows some affinities with the western languages.

The Tebul people also use 'village sign', Tebul Sign Language, due to a high incidence of deafness.

References

Sources
 .
Blench, Dendo, & Douyon, 2005 (ms). Tebul Ure, a language of the Dogon group in Northern Mali and its affinities

External links
Tebul Ure wordlist (Dendo and Blench, 2005)

Dogon languages
Languages of Mali